Waterfall railway station is located on the Illawarra line, serving the Sydney suburb of Waterfall. It is served by Sydney Trains T4 Illawarra line services and NSW TrainLink South Coast services.

History
The station opened on 9 March 1886 as Waterfalls, being renamed later in the year. It served as the line's terminus until it was extended to Scarborough in 1887. When the line was duplicated from Hurstville on 12 December 1890, the station was relocated northwards. In 1897 a locomotive depot opened.

On 4 May 1905 the station moved 600 metres north to its present location.

On 20 December 1994, a shunting accident involving two empty S sets saw one train jack-knife onto the platform, demolishing the concrete pedestrian bridge.

The original weatherboard building was demolished in 1995 and replaced by a rendered brick building.

South of Waterfall railway station is the site of the Waterfall train disaster, a rail accident that claimed the lives of the driver and six passengers on 31 January 2003.

Work commenced in late 2013 to make the station fully wheelchair accessible.

Sidings
Waterfall has sidings for staging freight trains in either direction and a bypass track for goods trains on either side of the platforms. There are also three sidings for the stabling of suburban electric trains to the east of the station. If both platforms at Waterfall station are occupied, then trains that do not stop at Waterfall will also pass by on the bypass tracks.

Platforms & services

Trackplan

References

Further reading
"Waterfall and its Three Stations" Australian Railway Historical Society Bulletin October 1961

External links

Waterfall station details Transport for New South Wales

Easy Access railway stations in Sydney
Railway stations in Sydney
Railway stations in Australia opened in 1886
Railway stations in Australia opened in 1905
Illawarra railway line
Sutherland Shire